This is a list of prime ministers of Lesotho since the formation of the post of Prime Minister of Lesotho in 1965, to the present day.

A total of seven people have served as Prime Minister of Lesotho (not counting one Acting Prime Minister and two Chairmen of the Military Council). Additionally, three persons, Ntsu Mokhehle, Pakalitha Mosisili and Tom Thabane, have served on two non-consecutive occasions.

The current Prime Minister is Sam Matekane, who was sworn in on 28 October 2022.

List of officeholders
Political parties

Other factions

Status

Timeline

See also

 List of monarchs of Lesotho
 Lists of office-holders

References

External links
 World Statesmen – Lesotho

Politics of Lesotho
Government of Lesotho
 
Lesotho
Lesotho politics-related lists
1965 establishments in Basutoland